is a 1957 black-and-white Japanese film directed by Seijun Suzuki. It is a thriller film with gangster film elements, based partly on John Ford's Stagecoach.

Cast 
 Taizō Fukami
 Hisako Hara
 and others

References

External links 
 

1950s mystery films
Japanese black-and-white films
1957 films
Films directed by Seijun Suzuki
Nikkatsu films
1950s Japanese films